Estádio do Marítimo (formerly and often still referred to as Estádio dos Barreiros) is a football stadium in Funchal, Portugal. It is the home stadium of Club Sport Marítimo and although much larger in its heyday, the stadium can now hold 10,932 spectators.

The old stadium itself was rather distinctive in design and shape. Built into a Funchal hillside, the stadium offered and still offers views of the bay, city, and the rising Madeiran mountains from its two "banana-shaped" stands that stretch the entire length of the field and curve around most of the running rack, but not entirely. The two stands were both all seated with the bancada nascente being totally uncovered and considerably smaller than the main bancada lateral. Because it was built into the ground, the top of the main stand, complete with its roof was actually only at street level, which required walking down several stairways to reach the stand from the main road.
Since 2016 the stadium has stands on every side of the pitch totally covered.

History
Football has been played on the site of the stadium since 1927, when it was known as the Campo dos Barreiros. The field was purchased in 1925 by one of Funchal's major football teams, Club Desportivo Nacional, to use as their home ground, officially inaugurating it on 26 June 1927, with a game against Vitória de Setúbal which finished 0-0. The ground was also used by rivals Marítimo, who relocated from their previous home the Campo do Almirante Reis, and so began a long groundshare which also included Clube de Futebol União, the city's third biggest sports club, who also became tenants.

In 1938, because of Nacional's precarious financial situation, leading to an overall poor maintenance and decay of the facilities, the club asked for assistance from the regional government in the way of a loan, remortgaging the land to a value of 280,000 escudos.

Funchal's desperation for a major sports venue had been recognised as far back as the 1920s by the local government, and with this in mind, the council purchased the land from the club at a price of 847,000 escudos to avoid the land falling into the hands of creditors, who would most likely have auctioned it off for agriculture use or property development.

The deeds were signed on 24 February 1939, under the condition that the land would be used solely for its original purpose as a sports facility. Plans were drawn up by local architect Couto Martins for a 17,000 capacity stadium, complete with an athletics track, car parks and access roads. Building commenced on 21 March 1951, with local manufacturer João Augusto de Sousa awarded the contract and engineers Félix do Amaral, João Marques de Almeida, and Rui Vieira also working on the construction, which cost a total of 12,000,000 escudos.

Estádio dos Barreiros was officially opened on 5 May 1957 by minister Arantes e Oliveira, and with a football match between a Madeira Select team and the Portugal B team, who ran out 5–2 winners in front of over 12,000 fans. Floodlights were installed a decade later and the first match played under the new lights took place on 28 May 1967.

In 1969, the regional government renamed the stadium, assigning it the name of Estádio do Professor Marcelo Caetano. However, the decision was not too popular with local fans and quickly fell into disuse, and was reverted to Estádio dos Barreiros. On 15 May 1977, a record crowd of 22,000 people squeezed into the stadium to see Marítimo gain promotion to the Primeira Liga for the first time. Due to the higher than capacity crowd, many spectators sat on the athletics running track and on the roof of the changing rooms to get a view of the match.

The stadium was home to Madeira's top three football clubs for many years, and this showed on the poor quality of the pitch, which could not handle three matches a week. In 1998, Nacional moved out into their own new stadium, the Estádio Eng. Rui Alves (now called the Estádio da Madeira) located in the Choupana district, to the north of Funchal.

Although it has had several face lifts over the years, the unique stadium has remained true to its original structure, with seating and new floodlights the only major evolutions on the site. The aging stadium is known as the Caldeirão (Cauldron) throughout Portugal, because of its famous uncomfortable and hostile atmosphere, the stadium has become a fortress for Marítimo, with many big teams struggling to win any points on their visits, notably Benfica, who famously took ten years to secure a win at the stadium, ending the curse in 2003.

Portugal national football team 

The following national team matches were held in the stadium.

New Stadium

In 2006, Marítimo unveiled ambitious plans for a new stadium in the Praia Formosa area of the city placing Barreiros' future as a major football venue in doubt, with União also working towards relocation. However, after several delays and a political war over funding and planning, the stadium plans were put on hold indefinitely, adding to a list of set-backs that stretch well over a decade. The fact that archrivals Nacional were allowed to construct a new stand and training facility at their Estádio da Madeira with government backing, angered Marítimo's fans even more. A year later, on September 14, 2007, an agreement between the club's directors and the Madeiran government (of whom own a 40% share of the club) was reached to use the site of the current Estádio dos Barreiros as the location of a brand new, reconstructed commercial stadium.

In October 2008, União moved back to their spiritual home at the Campo do Adelino Rodrigues in the heart of the city centre, leaving Marítimo as Barreiros' sole tenants and paving the way for complete redevelopment of the new stadium. Work began on the new stadium on July 20, 2009, with the realigning of the pitch and demolition of the Bancada Nascente, reducing the  capacity to 5,000 seats. The stadium will have a capacity of 10,932 seats and will be completed by December 2016.

Portugal national football team 

Portugal national football team matches held in the stadium since its renovation.

See also
Campo do Almirante Reis
Estádio da Madeira
Marítimo
Nacional da Madeira
União da Madeira

References

External links
New Stadium plan video from YouTube
StadiumDB.com images

Barreiros
C.S. Marítimo
C.D. Nacional
C.F. União
Sport in Madeira
Multi-purpose stadiums in Portugal
Funchal
Buildings and structures in Madeira
Sports venues completed in 1927